Sorn Seavmey (born 14 September 1995) is a Cambodian taekwondo practitioner and gold medalist in the women’s under-73 kg event at 2014 Asian Games in Incheon, South Korea. She was also a 2013 SEA Games gold medalist in Myanmar and the 2017 SEA Games in Malaysia. In 2014, she won Cambodia's first gold medal at the Asian Games since its participation in 1954. At the 2014 Incheon Asian Games, Seavmey defeated her first-round opponent from Uzbekistan 29-7, then defeated her Filipino opponent in the semi-final 6-5. In the final round, she defeated her opponent from Iran 7-4, becoming the first Cambodian to win an Asian Games medal. She is 183 cm and trains with her brother Sorn Elit and sister Sorn Davin, who also practice taekwondo.

Seavmey qualified for the 2016 Summer Olympics, where she competed in the women's +67 kg division. She was defeated by Reshmie Oogink of the Netherlands during the round of 16. She was the flag bearer for Cambodia during the Parade of Nations.

She was also the flag bearer for Cambodia at the 2018 Asian Games during the opening ceremony.

References

External links
 
 National Olympic Committee of Cambodia 
 Sorn Seavmey on Facebook

Living people
1995 births
Asian Games medalists in taekwondo
Asian Games gold medalists for Cambodia
Cambodian people of Chinese descent
Cambodian female taekwondo practitioners
Competitors at the 2011 Southeast Asian Games
Competitors at the 2013 Southeast Asian Games
Competitors at the 2017 Southeast Asian Games
Competitors at the 2019 Southeast Asian Games
Medalists at the 2014 Asian Games
Southeast Asian Games gold medalists for Cambodia
Southeast Asian Games medalists in taekwondo
Southeast Asian Games bronze medalists for Cambodia
Sportspeople from Phnom Penh
Taekwondo practitioners at the 2018 Asian Games
Taekwondo practitioners at the 2014 Asian Games
Taekwondo practitioners at the 2016 Summer Olympics
Olympic taekwondo practitioners of Cambodia
20th-century Cambodian women
21st-century Cambodian women